Pichilemu, sometimes referred to as El Pichilemu or El Pichilemo, was a Pichileminian newspaper published for the first time in 1944 by Carlos Rojas Pavez, municipal secretary and mayor of Pichilemu from 1967 to 1971. Rojas published the newspaper with the collaboration of José Arraño Acevedo and Miguel Larravide Blanco. It was later published by Washington Saldías González between 1986 and 1990, and then again in 1996 by Carlos Carmona Plá. In 2000, Saldías turned it into an online-only newspaper, named Pichilemu News.

Background
Augusto O. Ramírez, a newspaper editor from San Fernando, founded the first newspaper in Pichilemu, called El Puerto, on January 16, 1908. Nine years later, on January 14, 1917, he founded El Marino, which was published in 33 different editions.

History
Carlos Rojas Pavez, who had been working as municipal secretary of Pichilemu since 1937, founded on January 31, 1944 founded the Pichilemu newspaper. Six days before, on January 25, Rojas along with José Arraño Acevedo and Miguel Larravide Blanco made the "Declaration of Release" to the Governor of Colchagua Province, the only requisite in Chile to publish a newspaper. The first edition of the newspaper was distributed by shoe-polishers and newsvendors in the main streets of the city.

Only eight different editions of the newspaper were published in 1944. In September 1949, the ninth and last edition by Rojas was published.

In 1985, Carlos Rojas transferred the publishing rights of Pichilemu to Washington Saldías, who published the tenth edition of the newspaper on January 31, 1986, forty-two years after its first edition. Washington published 28 new editions, between 1986 and 1990.

Legacy
Saldías' project remained dormant until January 14, 2000, when he founded Pichilemu News, the first online newspaper in O'Higgins Region.

References

External links
 

Defunct newspapers published in Chile
Mass media in Pichilemu
1944 establishments in Chile
1944 disestablishments in Chile
1949 establishments in Chile
1949 disestablishments in Chile
1986 establishments in Chile
1990 disestablishments in Chile
1996 establishments in Chile
1996 disestablishments in Chile
Publications established in 1944
Publications disestablished in 1944
Publications established in 1949
Publications disestablished in 1949
Publications established in 1986
Publications disestablished in 1990
Publications established in 1996
Publications disestablished in 1996